The cession of Larache effectively took place on 20 November 1610, when Juan de Mendoza y Velasco, Marquis of San Germán, assumed control over the North African port of Larache on behalf of the Hispanic Monarchy.

History 
The acquisition of Larache by the Hispanic Monarchy had been an important—obsessive—target of the foreign policy of the reign of Philip II. It was, however, eventually deferred to the reign of Philip III. The place was promised by Mohammed esh Sheikh el Mamun in exchange for the Spanish support in the internal struggles of the Saadi sultanate against his brother Zidan Abu Maali.

Álvaro de Bazán, the Marquis of Santa Cruz, had already tried to occupy the city in 1608. Juan de Mendoza y Velasco, Marquis of San Germán, had himself led another unsuccessful attempt in the past. In November 1610, the Marquis was invited to take possession of the city by Mohammed esh Sheikh el Mamun, who left Spain before the Marquis to prepare for the latter's arrival to Larache, meeting in Tangier. The Marquis of San Germán, who brought a contingent of troops of about 3,000 infantrymen in the galleys of Pedro de Toledo, took possession of the port on 20 November 1610, meeting no hostilities .

Larache would remain under Spanish control until 1689, when it was seized by the troops of the Alaouite sultan Ismail Ibn Sharif.

References 
Citations

Bibliography
 
 
 
 

Saadi dynasty
Larache
Military operations of the Early Modern period
Spanish Africa